The National Union of Students (NUS) is the peak representative body for Australian higher education students. As of 2020, there are 21 student unions in Australian campuses affiliated to NUS. A student union is eligible for membership by its classification as a legitimate student representative body at any Australian post-secondary training provider and the payment of Union fees by the union according to the number of full-time study units of its students.

History
NUS in its current form came into being in 1987 after the collapse of its predecessor, the Australian Union of Students (AUS), in 1984. The AUS was first known from 1937 to 1971 as the National Union of Australian University Students (NUAUS), before allowing membership of colleges of higher education in 1971, which necessitated a name change.

NUS was formed at the same time that the Hawke government introduced the Higher Education Contribution Scheme (a system of deferred tuition payments), abolishing the free education system previously introduced by the Whitlam government.

NUS has had mixed success in its role as a lobby group and representative body. In particular, its limited finances have often meant that it has had difficulty making its presence felt on higher education issues. It was successful in the early 1990s in preventing the implementation of a deferred loan scheme in place of government student financial assistance, and in reducing the qualification age for student financial assistance.

NUS was unable to prevent the introduction of differential rates of HECS in 1996, but did lobby successfully to stop the introduction of a voucher system by then Federal Education Minister Dr. David Kemp despite later claiming victory in a similar campaign.

The union suffered another major setback in 2003 when despite intense lobbying of independent senators, the reform package of Dr. Brendan Nelson passed the Senate. This package permitted the introduction of Domestic Undergraduate Up-Front Fees (DUFF) by universities in addition to HECS places, and allowed universities to increase their HECS rates by 25%. Components of the legislation introducing VSU, and the mandatory offering of the Australian Workplace Agreement as a component of universities' enterprise bargaining practices were dropped.

In 2003, NUS membership fees became indexed to consumer price index (CPI) removing some of the strain on the union's finances. NUS charged $5 per student represented by each member organisation. This raised small fears that many small and regional campus organisations might disaffiliate due to increases in affiliation fees.

In 2006, NUS took a massive budget hit with the introduction of VSU.

In 2016, Australian National University Students' Association voted against accrediting with NUS, citing problems with the conduct of factional delegates at the National Conference. The Adelaide University Union (AUU) voted to cease their SRC from authorising payments of Accreditation to NUS in their March Meeting. The AUU's SRC later condemned the move and restated its affiliation, and intention to pay accreditation fees autonomously. The Wollongong Undergraduate Students' Association also held a referendum during 2016 to end their affiliation with the NUS; the affiliation was later restored.

In 2017, the Australian National University Students' Association voted to accredit with NUS once again. Also in 2017, the Tasmanian University Union voted to end its affiliation with the NUS.

Delegates and factions
The operations of NUS are dominated by several organised factions, some with close ties to the youth wings of Australian political parties. In 2019, factions operating within NUS include:
Student Unity (Unity), the Labor right faction. The faction controlled approximately 45% of elected delegates at the 2022 National Conference.
National Labor Students (NLS), the Labor left faction. The second largest faction, the NLS controlled around 22% of the delegates at the 2022 National Conference. Members of the faction vote on a position on all issues internally and then members are bound to vote in accordance with this. NLS are also constitutionally bound not to vote for, support, or negotiate with the Liberal faction. Following the 2020 NUS National Conference, the South Australian Caucus broke from NLS, forming National Organisation of Labor Students.
Grassroots (Groots) were a culmination of the former factions of the National Independents (NI, Indies) and Grassroots Left (GL, Groots). The National Independents and Grassroots Left factions merged to form the 'Grassroots Independents' ahead of the 2018 National Conference. They have traditionally been the third most prominent faction, consisting of independently aligned, Greens aligned members. Members are open to free votes, and fill out their own ballots. This grouping was estimated to have controlled approximately 2% of conference floor at the 2022 National Conference. The National Independents left the Grassroots ahead of the 2022 National Conference becoming either Small "i" indies or members of NLS.
Socialist Alternative (SAlt, SA, Trots), controlled around 18% of the votes at the 2022 National Conference, SAlt usually obtain 2–3 national office bearers in minor roles including ATSI, Ethno-Cultural, Environment, through negations with NLS.
Australian Liberal Students' Federation (ALSF, Liberals, Libs), the Liberal Party of Australia faction. The faction controlled around 2% of the vote at the 2022 National Conference. Despite the faction's historically small control of the votes, it has been successful in gaining positions for Liberal students including Tasmanian State Branch President Claire Chandler in 2012 and Clark Cooley in 2016 as well as Victorian General Secretary Matthew Lesh in 2014.
Small 'i' indies, are individuals attending NUS led events such as EdCon and NatCon, but are not necessarily a faction, but more of a grouping used to refer to a number independents who do not sit with a Grassroots Independents. they made up around 7% of the vote at the 2022 National Conference.

Financial and structural crisis

In a report commissioned by the NUS secretariat in 2013, independent auditors TLConsult authored a report which cited NUS' "inflexible factional system" as detrimental to the organisation and leading to "historical accounting approach … out of step with modern financial practices". Auditors "questioned whether some stakeholders generally understood their responsibilities to NUS", citing alliances by some national officers to factions, rather than NUS, as contributing the structural issues faced by the organisation.

The TLConsult audit said that NUS only had enough cash reserves to "sustain the organisation for approximately one year in its current form" and that although voluntary student unionism had resulted in a notable decline in revenue, it was structural problems, "unchanged for nearly two decades", that were the primary cause of the NUS' current financial problems.

In response to the financial pressures outlined in the audit which cited significant deficits run by NUS over the previous few years, and following outgoing NUS President Deanna Taylor's admission that they "the advice given to NUS is that were our income and expenditure levels to remain status quo, NUS would not exist beyond the next few years", delegates to the 2014 conference voted in favor of a financial and structural review, and to eliminate the stipend for the positions of National Indigenous, International Students and Disability Officer. However, an attempt to eliminate state officer bearer positions (presidents excepted) was not passed by conference delegates.

National Conference 
By its constitution, NUS must hold National Conference, its annual general meeting, in the second week of December each year. Held at a Victorian campus, the conference sees delegates from all accredited campuses gather to vote on policy that decides the direction of the union for the next year. The election of national and state officers, as well as campus representatives, occurs during the week.

National structure 

NUS' national structure is formalised into both a National Executive and State Branches.

The responsibilities of the National executive, as subscribed within the NUS constitution, include; setting the budget for the NUS; regularly monitoring of the finances of NUS; employing staff on behalf of NUS; authorising the publication of material on behalf of NUS; and implementing and interpreting the policy of the NUS. The National Executive may also delegate its powers as it considers appropriate.

The members of National Executive are:
 The National President (chair, casting vote only),
 The National officers (voting),
 12 General Executive Members (voting), and
 The State Presidents (voting)

National Officers of NUS do not carry a vote at the National Conference of NUS.

Members of National Executive may not hold more than 1 voting position on National Executive at the same time.

The national officers of NUS:

 National President,
 National General Secretary/National Deputy President,
 National Education Officer,
 National Welfare Officer,
 National Women's Officer, who must be a woman,
 Two National Queer Officers, one of whom must be a woman,
(non-paid national officers)
 National Small and Regional Campuses Officer, who must be a student currently enrolled at a small and/or regional NUS member campus, 
 National Aboriginal and Torres Strait Islander Officer, who must identify as a student from an indigenous background,
 National Ethno‐Cultural Officer, who must identify as a student from a culturally or linguistically diverse background, and,
 National International Students Officer, who must be currently enrolled as an international student
 National Disability Officer, who must identify as a student with a disability,
 National Vocational Education Officer.

State Executive

The state branches of the NUS include; New South Wales, Victoria, South Australia, the Australian Capital Territory, and Western Australia.

The members of State Executive are:
 The State President (chair),
 The State Education Vice President, and 
 The President (or equivalent officer) from each accredited campus.

National Officers 
The National Officers of NUS are elected annually at the National Conference, with their terms commencing in January.

President

National Secretary

Education Officer

Welfare Officer

Women's Officer

Queer/LGBTQIA+ Officer

Small and Regional Officer

Environment Officer 
A motion to abolish the National Environment Offer position was passed at the 2016 National Conference. This change came into effect at the 2017 National Conference.

Ethnocultural officer

Aboriginal and Torres Strait Islander Officer

International Officer

Disability Officer

Vocational Education Officer 
A motion to create the National Vocational Education Officer position was passed at the 2021 National Conference. This change came into effect at the 2022 National Conference.

State Officers 
The State Branch Officers of NUS are elected annually at the National Conference, with their terms commencing in January. State and Territories officers are only elected if there are accredited campus from that State/Territory. The State Branch positions other than President and Education Vice President were abolished after the 2015 National Conference, coming into effect at the conclusion of the 2016 term of office.

Victoria

New South Wales

South Australia

Queensland

Western Australia

Australian Capital Territory

Tasmania

Union affiliation
Typically University Student Union's Representative Council's will vote on NUS accreditation. As of 2022, accredited university Unions include;

References

External links
NUS Home
Council of Australian Postgraduate Associations (CAPA)
Council of International Students Australia (CISA)

Groups of students' unions
Students' unions in Australia
Student politics in Australia